Awaken the Guardian is the third studio album by American progressive metal band Fates Warning, released in 1986 through Metal Blade Records. The album was the band and their label's first to enter the U.S. Billboard 200, reaching No. 191 and remaining on that chart for four weeks. It is also the first Fates Warning album to feature guitarist Frank Aresti and the last with original singer John Arch, who was replaced by Ray Alder on their subsequent 1988 album No Exit.

Reissues
Awaken the Guardian has been reissued several times. The first was as part of a double album with No Exit in 1992, followed by a remastered edition in 1994, and once again as a deluxe Digipak edition on June 28, 2005. The latter includes a bonus disc containing demos and live tracks, as well as a DVD of a concert from December 28, 1986, at the Sundance Club in Long Island, New York; this being the only known video footage of the Awaken the Guardian line-up performing live.

Critical reception

Robert Taylor at AllMusic gave Awaken the Guardian three stars out of five, calling it "a closet classic from the underground metal years of the '80s" and the song "Guardian" being noted as a highlight. As with Fates Warning's previous album The Spectre Within (1985), Taylor recommended it more for fans of heavy metal than progressive metal, remarking that "the song structures are too rudimentary to be called progressive."

Jeff Wagner at Decibel magazine ranked the album at number 134 in the Decibel Hall of Fame, saying it was "one of the celebrated masterworks of the genre." Adrien Begrand at PopMatters, reviewing the 2005 reissue, called it the best of Fates Warning's catalog, adding that "such a stirring combination of traditional metal and progressive sounds would never be duplicated by the band", and concluding that "Awaken the Guardian still resonates with life today" and it "solidifies Fates Warning's place in metal history."

Loudwire named it in #4 on its list "Top 25 Progressive Metal Albums of All Time."

Track listing

Personnel
Fates Warning
John Arch – vocals, producer
Frank Aresti – guitar, producer
Jim Matheos – guitar, producer
Jim Archambault – keyboard
Steve Zimmerman – drums, production
Joe DiBiase – bass, production

Production
Bill Metoyer – engineer
Scott Campbell, Steve Himelfarb, Kevin Beauchamp, Dave Obrizzo – assistant engineers
Eddy Schreyer – mastering, remastering (reissue)

Charts

References

Fates Warning albums
1986 albums
Metal Blade Records albums